The Armenian alphabet (or) is an alphabetic writing system used to write Armenian. It was developed around 405 AD by Mesrop Mashtots, an Armenian linguist and ecclesiastical leader. However earliest surviving manuscripts written in Armenian using Armenian script date from the 9th–10th century. The system originally had 36 letters; eventually, three more were adopted. The alphabet was also in wide use in the Ottoman Empire around the 18th and 19th centuries.

Armenian is written horizontally, left to right.

History and development

Possible antecedents
One of the classical accounts about the existence of an Armenian alphabet before Mesrop Mashtots, comes from Philo of Alexandria (20 BCE – 50 CE), who in his writings notes that the work of the Greek philosopher and historian Metrodorus of Scepsis, On Animals, was translated into Armenian. Metrodorus was a close friend and a court historian of the Armenian emperor Tigranes the Great and also wrote his biography. A third century Roman theologian, Hippolytus of Rome (170–235 CE), in his Chronicle, while writing about his contemporary, Emperor Severus Alexander ( CE), mentions that the Armenians are amongst those nations who have their own distinct alphabet.

Philostratus the Athenian, a sophist of the second and third centuries CE, wrote:

According to the fifth-century Armenian historian Movses of Khoren, Bardesanes of Edessa (154–222 CE), who founded the Gnostic current of the Bardaisanites, went to the Armenian castle of Ani and there read the work of a pre-Christian Armenian priest named Voghyump, written in the Mithraic (Mehean or Mihrean lit. of Mihr or of Mithra – the Armenian national God of Light, Truth and the Sun) script of the Armenian temples in which, amongst other histories, an episode was noted of the Armenian King Tigranes VII (reigned from 144–161, and again 164–186 CE) erecting a monument on the tomb of his brother, the Mithraic High Priest of the Kingdom of Greater Armenia, Mazhan. Movses of Khoren notes that Bardesanes translated this Armenian book into Syriac (Aramaic), and later also into Greek. Another important evidence for the existence of a pre-Mashtotsian alphabet is the fact that the pantheon of the ancient Armenians included Tir, who was the Patron God of Writing and Science.

A 13th-century Armenian historian, Vardan Areveltsi, in his History, notes that during the reign of the Armenian King Leo the Magnificent, artifacts were found bearing "Armenian inscriptions of the heathen kings of the ancient times".
The evidence that the Armenian scholars of the Middle Ages knew about the existence of a pre-Mashtotsian alphabet can also be found in other medieval works, including the first book composed in the Mashtotsian alphabet by the pupil of Mashtots, Koriwn, in the first half of the fifth century. Koriwn notes that Mashtots was told of the existence of ancient Armenian letters which he was initially trying to integrate into his own alphabet.

Creation by Mashtots

The Armenian alphabet was introduced by Mesrop Mashtots and Isaac of Armenia (Sahak Partev) in AD 405. Medieval Armenian sources also claim that Mashtots invented the Georgian and Caucasian Albanian alphabets around the same time. However, most scholars link the creation of the Georgian script to the process of Christianization of Iberia, a core Georgian kingdom of Kartli. The alphabet was therefore most probably created between the conversion of Iberia under Mirian III (326 or 337) and the Bir el Qutt inscriptions of 430, contemporaneously with the Armenian alphabet. Traditionally, the following phrase translated from Solomon's Book of Proverbs is said to be the first sentence to be written down in Armenian by Mashtots:

Various scripts have been credited with being the prototype for the Armenian alphabet. Pahlavi was the priestly script in Armenia before the introduction of Christianity, and Syriac, along with Greek, was one of the alphabets of Christian scripture. Armenian shows some similarities to both. However, the general consensus is that Armenian is modeled after the Greek alphabet, supplemented with letters from a different source or sources for Armenian sounds not found in Greek. This is suggested by the Greek order of the Armenian alphabet; the ow ligature for the vowel , as in Greek; the similarity of the letter   in shape and sound value to Cyrillic Ии and (Modern) Greek Ηη; and the shapes of letters which "seem derived from a variety of cursive Greek",  including Greek/Armenian pairs /, /, and /. It has been speculated by some scholars in African studies, following Dimitri Olderogge, that the Ge'ez script had an influence on certain letter shapes, but this has not been supported by any experts in Armenian studies.

There are four principal calligraphic hands of the script. , or 'ironclad letters', seen as Mesrop's original, was used in manuscripts from the 5th to 13th century and is still preferred for epigraphic inscriptions. , or 'cursive', was invented in the 10th century and became popular in the 13th. It has been the standard printed form since the 16th century. , or 'minuscule', invented initially for speed, was extensively used in the Armenian diaspora in the 16th to 18th centuries, and later became popular in printing. , or 'slanted writing', is now the most common form.

The earliest known example of the script's usage was a dedicatory inscription over the west door of the church of Saint Sarkis in Tekor. Based on the known individuals mentioned in the inscription, it has been dated to the 480s. The earliest known surviving example of usage outside of Armenia is a mid-6th century mosaic inscription in the chapel of St Polyeuctos in Jerusalem. A papyrus discovered in 1892 at Fayyum and containing Greek words written in Armenian script has been dated on historical grounds to before the Arab conquest of Egypt, i.e. before 640, and on paleographic grounds to the 6th century and perhaps even the late 5th century. It is now in the Bibliotheque Nationale de France. The earliest surviving manuscripts written in Armenian using Armenian script date from the 9th–10th century.

Certain shifts in the language were at first not reflected in the orthography. The digraph   (au) followed by a consonant used to be pronounced [au] (as in luau) in Classical Armenian, but due to a sound shift it came to be pronounced , and has since the 13th century been written  (ō). For example, classical  ('day') became pronounced , and is now written . (One word has kept aw, now pronounced :  'pigeon', and there are a few proper names still having aw before a consonant:  Taurus,  Faustus, etc.) For this reason, today there are native Armenian words beginning with the letter  (ō) although this letter was taken from the Greek alphabet to write foreign words beginning with o .

The number and order of the letters have changed over time. In the Middle Ages, two new letters were introduced in order to better represent foreign sounds; this increased the number of letters from 36 to 38. From 1922 to 1924, Soviet Armenia adopted a reformed spelling of the Armenian language. The reform changed the digraph  and the ligature  into two new letters, but it generally did not change the pronunciation of individual letters. Those outside of the Soviet sphere (including all Western Armenians as well as Eastern Armenians in Iran) have rejected the reformed spellings, and continue to use the traditional Armenian orthography. They criticize some aspects of the reforms (see the footnotes of the chart) and allege political motives behind them.

Alphabet 

Notes:
Primarily used in classical orthography; after the reform used word-initially and in some compound words.
Except in   'who' and   'those (people)' in Eastern Armenian.
Iranian Armenians (who speak a subbranch of Eastern Armenian) pronounce the sound represented by this letter with a retracted tongue body : post-alveolar rather than alveolar. 
In reformed orthography, they are separate letters of the alphabet.
In classical orthography, the letter usually represents , except in the digraph  . The spelling reform in Soviet Armenia replaced  with the trigraph .
Except in the present tense of 'to be':   'I am',   'you are (sing.)',   'we are',   'you are (pl.)',   'they are'.
The letter  is generally used only at the start or end of a word, and so the sound  is typically unwritten between consonants. 'one more time'.

Handwritten forms
In handwriting, the upper- and lower-case letters look more similar than they do in print, and the stroke order is more apparent.

Ligatures
Ancient Armenian manuscripts used many ligatures. Some of the commonly used ligatures are:  (+),  (+),  (+),  (+),  (+),  (+), etc. Armenian print typefaces also include many ligatures. In the new orthography, the character  is no longer a typographical ligature, but a distinct letter, placed in the new alphabetic sequence, before "o".

Punctuation

Armenian punctuation marks outside a word:

 [ «  » ] The  are used as ordinary quotation marks and they are placed like French guillemets: just above the baseline (preferably vertically centered in the middle of the x-height of Armenian lowercase letters).  The computer-induced use of English-style single or double quotes (vertical, diagonal or curly forms, placed above the baseline near the M-height of uppercase or tall lowercase letters and at the same level as accents) is strongly discouraged in Armenian as they look too much like other – unrelated – Armenian punctuations. 
 [ , ] The  is used as a comma, and placed as in English.
 [ ՝ ] The  (which looks like a comma-shaped reversed apostrophe) is used as a short stop, and placed in the same manner as the semicolon, to indicate a pause that is longer than that of a comma, but shorter than that of a colon; in many texts it is replaced by the single opening single quote (a 6-shaped, or mirrored 9-shaped, or descending-wedge-shaped elevated comma), or by a spacing grave accent.
 [ ․ ] The  (whose single dot on the baseline looks like a Latin full stop) is used like an ordinary colon, mainly to separate two closely related (but still independent) clauses, or when a long list of items follows. 
The following Armenian punctuation marks placed above and slightly to the right of the vowel whose tone is modified, in order to reflect intonation:
 [ ՜ ] The  (which looks like a diagonally rising tilde) is used as an exclamation mark.
 [ ՛ ] The  (which looks like a non-spacing acute accent) is used as an emphasis mark.
 [ ՞ ] The  is used as a question mark.

Armenian punctuation marks used inside a word: 
 [ ֊ ] The  is used as the ordinary Armenian hyphen.
 [ ՟ ] The  was used as an Armenian abbreviation mark, and was placed on top of an abbreviated word to indicate that it was abbreviated. It is now obsolete.
 [ ՚ ] The  is used as a spacing apostrophe (which looks either like a vertical stick or wedge pointing down, or as an elevated 9-shaped comma, or as a small superscript left-to-right closing parenthesis or half ring), only in Western Armenian, to indicate elision of a vowel, usually .

Transliteration

The letter  (w) is rarely used. It is part of a digraph and it is also used in ligatures, which are the only places where  is used.

ISO 9985 (1996) transliterates the Armenian alphabet for modern Armenian as follows:

In the linguistic literature on Classical Armenian, slightly different systems are in use.

Use for other languages

For about 250 years, from the early 18th century until around 1950, more than 2,000 books in the Turkish language were printed using the Armenian alphabet. Not only did Armenians read this Turkish in Armenian script, so did the non-Armenian (including the Ottoman Turkish) elite. An American correspondent in Marash in 1864 calls the alphabet "Armeno-Turkish", describing it as consisting of 31 Armenian letters and "infinitely superior" to the Arabic or Greek alphabets for rendering Turkish. This Armenian script was used alongside the Arabic script on official documents of the Ottoman Empire written in Ottoman Turkish language. For instance, the first novel to be written in Turkish in the Ottoman Empire was Vartan Pasha's 1851 Akabi Hikayesi, written in the Armenian script. When the Armenian Duzian family managed the Ottoman mint during the reign of Abdülmecid I, they kept records in Armenian script but in the Turkish language. From the middle of the 19th century, the Armenian alphabet was also used for books written in the Kurdish language in the Ottoman Empire.

The Armenian script was also used by Turkish-speaking assimilated Armenians between the 1840s and 1890s. Constantinople was the main center of Armenian-scripted Turkish press. This portion of the Armenian press declined in the early twentieth century but continued until the Armenian genocide of 1915.

In areas inhabited by both Armenians and Assyrians, Syriac texts were occasionally written in the Armenian script, although the opposite phenomenon, Armenian texts written in Serto, the Western Syriac script, is more common.

The Kipchak-speaking Armenian Christians of Podolia and Galicia used an Armenian alphabet to produce an extensive amount of literature between 1524 and 1669.

The Armenian script, along with the Georgian, was used by the poet Sayat-Nova in his Armenian poems.

An Armenian alphabet was an official script for the Kurdish language in 1921–1928 in Soviet Armenia.

Character encodings

The Armenian alphabet was added to the Unicode Standard in version 1.0, in October 1991. It is assigned the range U+0530–058F. Five Armenian ligatures are encoded in the "Alphabetic presentation forms" block (code point range U+FB13–FB17).

On 15 June 2011, the Unicode Technical Committee (UTC) accepted the Armenian dram sign for inclusion in the future versions of the Unicode Standard and assigned a code for the sign – U+058F (֏). In 2012 the sign was finally adopted in the Armenian block of ISO and Unicode international standards.

The Armenian eternity sign, since 2013, is assigned Unicode U+058D (֍ – RIGHT-FACING ARMENIAN ETERNITY SIGN) and, for its left-facing variant, U+058E (֎ – LEFT-FACING ARMENIAN ETERNITY SIGN).

Legacy

ArmSCII
ArmSCII is a character encoding developed between 1991 and 1999. ArmSCII was popular on the Windows 9x operating systems. With the development of the Unicode standard and its availability on modern operating systems, it has been rendered obsolete.

Arasan-compatible
Arasan-compatible fonts are based on the encoding of the original Arasan font by Hrant Papazian (he started encoding in use since 1986), which simply replaces the Latin characters (among others) of the ASCII encoding with Armenian ones. For example, the ASCII code for the Latin character  (65) represents the Armenian character .

While Arasan-compatible fonts were popular among many users on Windows 9x, the encoding has been deprecated by the Unicode standard.

Keyboard layouts
The standard Eastern and Western Armenian keyboards are based on the layout of the font Arasan. These keyboard layouts are mostly a phonetic transliteration of the Latin QWERTY layout and allow direct access to every character in the alphabet.

The phonetic layout is not very performant, due to the letter frequency difference between the Armenian and English languages, although it is easier to learn and use.

See also 

 Armenian braille
 Armenian calendar
 Armenian numerals
 Classical Armenian orthography
 Reformed Armenian orthography
 Romanization of Armenian (includes ISO 9985)

References

External links 
 armenian-alphabet.com   - animated interactive handwritten Armenian alphabet.
 բառարան.հայ – Armenian dictionary.
 Armenian Apostolic (Orthodox) Church Library Online (in English, Armenian, and Russian)
Information on Armenian character set encoding.

Armenian Phonetic Keyboard Layout
 Phonetic Keyboard Layout for Eastern Armenian

Armenian Transliteration
 English / French script to Armenian Transliteration Hayadar.com – Online, Latin to Armenian transliteration engine.
 Latin-Armenian Transliteration Converts Latin letters into Armenian and vice versa. Supports multiple transliteration tables and spell checking.
 Transliteration schemes for the Armenian alphabet (transliteration.eki.ee)

Armenian Orthography converters
 Nayiri.com (integrated orthography converter: reformed to classical)

 
4th century in Armenia
Keyboard layouts
Masterpieces of the Oral and Intangible Heritage of Humanity